Schin op Geul railway station is located in Schin op Geul, the Netherlands. The station opened on 23 October 1853 on the
Maastricht–Aachen railway. In 1914, Schin op Geul became one end of a Heerlen–Schin op Geul railway.

The station building is used as a restaurant as well as a waiting area.

Train services

Schin op Geul station is served by Arriva with the following train services:
Stoptrein S4: Maastricht–Heerlen

Schin op Geul is the western terminus of the heritage railway to Aachen. That line is exploited by the Zuid-Limburgse Stoomtrein Maatschappij.

References

External links
ZLSM website 

Railway stations on the Heuvellandlijn
Railway stations opened in 1853
Rijksmonuments in Valkenburg aan de Geul
Railway stations in Valkenburg aan de Geul